Local elections were held in the Federation of Malaya in 1958.

City council election

George Town

Municipal election

Kuala Lumpur

Malacca

Town councils election

Alor Star

Bachok

Bandar Maharani, Muar

Bandar Penggaram, Batu Pahat

Besut

Bukit Mertajam

Butterworth

Ipoh-Menglembu

Johore Bahru

Kampar

Klang

Kluang

Kota Bharu

Kuala Kangsar

Kuala Pilah

Kuala Trengganu

Kuantan

Mersing

Pasir Mas

Pasir Puteh

Pontian

Raub

Segamat

Seremban

Sungei Patani

Taiping

Tanjong Malim

Tapah

Teluk Anson

Temerloh-Mentekab

Tumpat

Rural district council election

Alor Gajah

Berserah

Kelantan

Malacca Tengah

References

1958
1958 elections in Malaya
1958 elections in Asia